The Saint Vincent and the Grenadines national football team represents Saint Vincent and the Grenadines in men's international football. It is controlled by the Saint Vincent and the Grenadines Football Federation.

The team finished second in the Caribbean Cup in 1995, and participated at the 1996 CONCACAF Gold Cup. Its first FIFA World Cup qualification attempt was for the 1994 edition, and it has entered every World Cup qualification since.

History

1936–1995
Saint Vincent and the Grenadines played their first two international matches, against their neighbour Barbados in 1936 - both matches ending in a 1–1 draw. In the '60s and '70s, they played several editions of the Windward Islands Tournament, winning the 1965 and 1966 competitions. They also participated in the 1979, qualifying to the final stage and finishing in second place behind Haiti. In the following edition, in 1981, they reached the final stage but again finished in second, this time two points off of Trinidad and Tobago.

Saint Vincent and the Grenadines qualified for the inaugural 1989 Caribbean Cup, finishing top of their qualification group including a 9–0 victory over Sint Maarten. In the finals, they would fail to get out of the group, finishing bottom behind Grenada and Netherlands Antilles. They would reach the final phase of the Caribbean Cup again in consecutive years, 1992 and 1993, without much luck, finishing last and second last respectively.

At the end of 1992, the Vincy Heat participated in their first World Cup qualifiers. They got through the first rounds, eliminating Saint Lucia (3–2 on aggregate) and Suriname (2–1 on aggregate), to advance to the second phase, where they finished bottom of the group, with six losses in as many games. Especially painful was the 11–0 defeat that Mexico dealt them at the Azteca Stadium, the worst in their history.

1996 Gold Cup
Saint Vincent and the Grenadines qualified for the 1996 CONCACAF Gold Cup, by obtaining the runner-up position in the 1995 Caribbean Cup. During qualification for the Caribbean Cup, Vincy Heat had dispatched Monserrat 20–0 over two legs. They had gone on to finish top of their group in the main competition and defeated Cuba in the semi-finals 3–2, however Trinidad and Tobago proved too strong in the final and won 5–0. In the 1996 Gold Cup, the Vincy Heat failed to register a victory, losing 5–0 to Mexico and 3–0 to Guatemala.

1996–present 
Saint Vincent and the Grenadines would qualify again for the 1996 Caribbean Cup but this time finish bottom of their group. It would be eleven years before they qualified again, on goals scored, following their 8–0 thrashing of Saint Lucia with five goals from Shandel Samuel which saw them edge out Jamaica. In the 2007 tournament, Vincy Heat only managed one win, against Guyana 2–0, and finished bottom of their group again.

In 1998 World Cup qualifiers, the Saint Vincentian team beat Puerto Rico 9–1 over two legs, then defeated Saint Kitts and Nevis on away goals, thanks to a 2–2 draw in Basseterre. In the third round of qualifying they finished with six defeats in six games, including an 11–3 loss to Honduras. In the 2002 qualifiers, they beat the U.S. Virgin Islands 14–1 on aggregate, Saint Kitts and Nevis (3–1) and Antigua and Barbuda (5–2) but again finished without a win in the qualification semi-finals.

They improved in the 2006 qualifiers beating Nicaragua to advance to the third round for the third consecutive time, and obtaining two victories over Saint Kitts and Nevis, finishing in third place. However, in the 2010 qualifiers, they were eliminated for the first time in the second qualifying round, at the hands of Canada, who prevailed with an aggregate score of 7–1. In 2014 qualification, Saint Vincent and the Grenadines won once against Grenada to finish 13 points behind Guatemala. In 2018 World Cup qualification, they managed to beat Guyana 6–6 on away goals, then beat Aruba 3–2 to make it to the fourth round group stage. There they failed to get a single point, conceding 34 goals and finishing bottom of their group, including a 9–3 loss to Guatemala.

Results and schedule

The following is a list of match results in the last 12 months, as well as any future matches that have been scheduled.

2022

2023

Coaching history

 Jochen Figge (1985)
 Millington Elliot (1990–1992)
 Jorge Ramos (1992)
 Ignacio Vergelli (1992–1995)
 Lenny Taylor (1995–1996)
 Bertille St. Clair (1996)
 Samuel Carrington (1996–2000)
 Lenny Taylor (2000–2001)
 Elvis Brown (2002)
 Adrian Shaw (2003)
/ Zoran Vraneš (2004–2007)
 Roger Gurley (2008)
 Kendale Mercury (2009)
 Stewart Hall (2009–2011)
 Colwyn Rowe (2011)
 Cornelius Huggins (2012–2016)
 Keith Ollivierre (2016)
 Cornelius Huggins (2016–2018)
 Keith Ollivierre (2018)
 Kendale Mercury (2018–present)

Players

Current squad
 The following players were called up for the 2022–23 CONCACAF Nations League matches.
 Match dates: 3, 6, 10 and 14 June 2022
 Caps and goals correct as of:' 14 June 2022, after the match against .

Recent call-ups

Player recordsPlayers in bold are still active with Saint Vincent and the Grenadines.''

Competitive record

FIFA World Cup

CONCACAF Championship & CONCACAF Gold Cup

CONCACAF Nations League

Caribbean Cup

References

External links

 of the National team
Individual Records at the RSSSF

 
Caribbean national association football teams